Hypericum thymopsis is a species of flowering plant in the family Hypericaceae which is endemic to Turkey.

References

thymopsis
Endemic flora of Turkey